René François Nicolas Marie Bazin (26 December 1853 – 20 July 1932) was a French novelist.

Biography
Born at Angers, he studied law in Paris, and on his return to Angers became Professor of Law in the Catholic university. In 1876, Bazin married Aline Bricard. The couple had two sons and six daughters. He contributed to Parisian journals a series of sketches of provincial life and descriptions of travel, and wrote Stephanette (1884), but he made his reputation with Une Tache d'Encre (A Spot of Ink) (1888), which received a prize from the Academy. He was admitted to the Académie française on 28 April 1904, to replace Ernest Legouvé.

René Bazin was a Knight Commander of the Order of St. Gregory the Great, and was President of the Corporation des Publicistes Chretiens.

Works
Other novels:
 (1890; English tr., This, My Son, 1908)
 (1892)
 (1893; English tr., Those of his own Household, 1914)
 (1894)
 (1897; English tr., Redemption, 1908)
 (1899; English tr., Autumn Glory, 1901), a picture of the decay of peasant farming set in La Vendée; it was an indirect plea for the development of provincial France
 (1901; English tr., Children of Alsace), a story which was dramatized and acted in the following year
 (1903)
 (1903)
 (1905; English tr., The Nun, 1908)
 (1907; English tr., The Coming Harvest, 1908)
 (1908)
La Barrière (1910; English tr., The Barrier)
Davidée Birot (1912; English tr. by Mary D. Frost)
Gingolph l'Abandonné (1914)
 (1917)
 (1919)
 (1919), regarded as a masterpiece by some
 (1921; English tr., Charles de Foucauld, Hermit and Explorer, 1923)

A volume of  appeared in 1906. (1913). Bazin is known to English and American readers for rendering the Italy of his time, The Italians of To-Day (1904).

After 1914 he published two volumes of war sketches, Pages religieuses (1915) and Aujourd'hui et demain (1916).

Notes

Further reading
 Coll, Jessie Pauline (1936). The Novels of René Bazin. University of Oklahoma.
 Doumic, René (1899). "René Bazin." In: Contemporary French Novelists. New York: Thomas Y. Crowell & Company, pp. 377–402.
 Gosse, Edmund (1905). "M. René Bazin." In: French Profiles. New York : Dodd, Mead and company, pp. 266–291.
 Mauriac, François (1931). René Bazin. Paris: F. Alcan.
 Moreau, Abel (1957). René Bazin. Paris: Caritas.
 Stimson, Henry A. (1904). "The Novels of René Bazin," The Booklovers Magazine, Vol. IV, pp. 745–747
 Waite, Alice Webber (1928). René Bazin: An Idealistic Realist. University of Nebraska (Lincoln Campus).

External links

 
 
 
 Edmund Burke et la Révolution
 The René Bazin society in France
 René Bazin's works on the reference site Open Library

1853 births
1932 deaths
People from Angers
Academic staff of the Catholic University of the West
Members of the Académie Française
19th-century French novelists
20th-century French novelists
20th-century French male writers
French male novelists
19th-century French male writers
Officiers of the Légion d'honneur